Vít Štětina (born 29 September 1989) is a Czech football player who plays for Czech second division side SK Sulko Zábřeh.

Career
Štětina joined SK Sigma Olomouc's reserve side in 2008, and would make five Gambrinus liga appearances for the first team before leaving the club in 2010.

Notes

Czech footballers
1989 births
Living people
SK Sigma Olomouc players
Association football midfielders